Saa Emerson Lamina, born in Koidutown, Kono District, is a Sierra Leoneean politician and the Mayor of Koidu City. Mr. Lamina is the youngest Mayor in Sierra Leone's history, and at the time of his inauguration was the youngest Mayor in West Africa. Mayor Lamina is adored and loved by the people of Kono for his humility and his progressive policies . He has always been focused on building his city lot by lot, block by block. He's known for bringing city government closer to the people, by holding regular town-hall meetings, press conferences and quarterly mobile council meetings in the various neighborhoods of the city (first of it kind in the country), which earned him the nickname "the mayor of neighborhoods."  Soon after taking office, Mayor Lamina called for more transparent, participatory, and collaborative government. Mayor Lamina, also known as Mr. Incorruptible, introduced strict anti-corruption programs and open-government policies to the dismay of the district political elites, paramount chiefs, and party leaders in the national capital Freetown, who have been the beneficiaries of decades long culture of corruption that has kept the district on the bottom in terms of development . The diamond rich Kono District (the bread basket of the nation) has been the most neglected district in the country and its capital Koidu City was the most under-develop city in the country . The city was completely burnt down during the civil war in the nineteen-nineties. But under Mayor Lamina's leadership, Koidu City has seen a lot of improvements. His administration has installed hundreds of new solar lights in the city, paved major streets, rehabilitated and reconstructed schools, provided new furniture to primary and secondary schools, rehabilitated the Koidu Government Hospital and procured essential drugs for the hospital, established bi-lateral ties with cities around the world, and implemented policies targeting Diasporas as agents for development.

Early life and education 
Saa Emerson Lamina was born in Koidutown, Kono District, Eastern Sierra Leone to the family of a veteran Head Teacher, Mr. T.J.B. Lamina and a Midwife Nurse, Mrs. Sia Elizabeth Lamina née Bosadu. The young lad was aptly endowed with intelligence, strength and tack right from childhood. He completed his Primary education at the U.M.C. Boys School, Koidu City. Due to the eleven years civil war in the country, he attended various secondary schools, including Magburaka Government Secondary School for Boys in Magburaka. He holds a Bachelor of Arts (B.A.Ed) degree in Linguistics, and Double Master's degrees in Educational Administration (M.Ed.) and Peace and Development Studies (MA-PADS) respectively from the Njala University College, Sierra Leone. At Njala University, Mr. Lamina was very active in student government. He rose to the Presidency of Njala University Students Union Government and also served in other capacities, including: President of Kono Student's Union (KONSU); President of Magbaraka Old Boy's Association (MOBA); Coordinator: Human Rights Clinic (NUC); Editor in Chief: Spectacle Press NU; and Director of Information: National Union of Sierra Leone Students (NUSS).

Career 
Saa Emerson Lamina became mayor of Koidu City after winning a resounding victory in 2012.

Koidu City Mayor vs. OCTEA Mining Company 
In his New Year's Day message marking the start of 2015 and the end of 2014, the Mayor of Koidu City Saa Emerson Lamina said the Council has resolved that they will take legal action against Koidu Holdings OCTEA Mining Company for tax evasion. The people of the city accused the multi-million dollars diamond mining company of reneging on its obligations to pay taxes to the city. Mayor Lamina in his statements to journalists and civil society groups had said the company was owing the council in relation to property taxes on its heavy duty mining equipment, European and African styled supermarkets, canteens, eight powerhouses, modernized dwelling houses and what`s believed to be Africa`s second largest diamond processing plant (180 tons per hour). The mayor said the action of the company had had negative impact towards development in the city, and described it as a "gross contravention of the agreement it signed with the government of Sierra Leone in 2010 and sections 45, 56, 69, 70, and 71 of the Local Council Act of 2004 which make provisions for property tax payment."
The mayor hope to use the money, if paid, to undertake tangible developments that he say will positively impact lives of the ordinary people who are directly affected by the mining practices of the company. Major civil society organizations in the district thrown their weight behind the Mayor, including the Knowledge for Community Empowerment Organisation (KoCEPO), Campaign for Just Mining (CJM), Advocate for Social Justice and Development (ASJD) and Leadership Efficiency and Advocacy for Development (LEAD) Sierra Leone.

The mayor's legal action against OCTEA Diamond Mining Company did not go down well with the local traditional chiefs, in particular Paramount Chief Paul Saquee, and top APC government officials in Freetown, including the President Ernest Bai Koroma and the Minister of Local Government Diana Finda Konomanyi, all of whom according to the people of Koidu City have been bought by the multimillion-dollar mining company and are protecting the company for selfish reasons. There have been several attempt by these officials to undermine the young mayor's efforts to recover money owed to the city. The 2007 Koidu-Sefadu protest was aimed at OCTEA Mining Company. And in 2013 hundreds of workers protested against OCTEA Mining Company non-payment of bonuses, for an end to racism, and improved conditions at Sierra Leone's largest diamond mine in Koidu. Following a blockade of the entrances and clashes with scabs, the armed forces were deployed, who opened fire on the workers, killing two and injuring many others.

References

Living people
People from Koidu
Mayors of places in Sierra Leone
Year of birth missing (living people)